A  (plural flamens or flamines) was a priest of the ancient Roman religion who was assigned to one of eighteen deities with official cults during the Roman Republic. The most important of these were the three  (or "major priests"), who served the important Roman gods Jupiter, Mars, and Quirinus. Two of the  served deities whose names are now unknown; among the others are deities about whom little is known other than the name. During the Imperial era, the cult of a deified emperor also had a flamen.

The fifteen Republican flamens were members of the Pontifical College, who administered state-sponsored religion.

Etymology 
The etymology of  remains obscure, and perhaps undecidable. The term is traditionally connected with the Proto-Germanic verb *blōtanan ("to sacrifice"; cf. Gothic blotan), by positing a Proto-Indo-European stem *bʰleh₂d-m(e)n- (or *bʰleh₂g-m(e)n-), which could have originally meant "sacrifice". However, the link remains uncertain since it is impossible to decide whether the Latin form reflects an earlier flă-men, flăd-men or flăg-smen.

Indo-European scholar G. Dumézil attempted to link the term to the Sanskrit word brahman. His etymology has problems in terms of phonological shifts, and modern linguists have generally rejected it.
Andrew Sihler considers the claim that flamen might be a cognate of the Vedic term to be as plausible. He notes that the hypothesis of a connection to Gothic blotan and via Proto-Indo-European *bʰleh₂d-m(e)n- is equally plausible.

History
At the time of the religious reformation by Augustus, the origins and functions of many of the long-neglected gods resident in Rome were confusing even to the Romans themselves. The obscurity of some of the deities assigned a flamen (for example Falacer, Palatua, Quirinus and Volturnus) suggests that the office dated back to Archaic Rome. Many scholars assume that the  existed at least from the time of the early Roman kings, prior to the establishment of the Republic. The Romans themselves credited the foundation of the priesthood to Numa Pompilius, the second king of Rome. According to Livy, Numa created the offices of the three  and assigned them each a fine robe of office and a curule chair. The  were circumscribed by many taboos.

The flamen was a sacred position within Roman society; however, it could be used for political purposes. Certain people could be appointed flamen to stop them from gaining power. For example, flamines were not allowed to ride a horse; therefore, this would make it extremely difficult for such a person to lead and command an army. By attaining such a position, the flamines were not permitted to run or hold a political office. There may have been flamines appointed simply to stop their progression in power and politics for reasons such as making enemies or simply jealousy.

Appointment 
The flamen was a high position within Roman society and religion. Therefore, the selection process was difficult for those wishing to be chosen as flamen. In the case of the Flamen Dialis, they were appointed by the Pontifex Maximus. The Pontifex Maximus did not just select a new Flamen Dialis, but "scrutinized each candidate's qualifications in order to ensure that he and his wife were fit to serve." After the flamen and his wife were chosen, they then had to participate in a Roman tradition and ceremony known as captio. This ceremony was performed by an augur. It was the augur's job to make sure the gods would accept the new flamen. This was done by asking for the king of the gods, Jupiter's blessing, and the gods would respond by providing the proper signs to the people. These ceremonies were known as comitia calata ("callate assemblies") and they were performed on the Capitoline Hill.

Privileges and disadvantages 
Such a position in Roman society came with many privileges which in turn gave flamines a unique power. In law and criminal courts, the flamen wielded great power. When a person was deemed a criminal, they could appeal to a flamen, who had the power of pardoning criminals. There were also several other privileges that the flamen possessed. According to Cyril Bailey these include: exemption from the Patria Potestas (lit. power of the father) of his father; the wearing of the toga praetexta; and, the privileges of having a lictor of his own, of sitting on the curule chair, and having an ex officio place in the Senate. During the sack of Rome by the Gauls in 390 BCE, the flamines were also given a special task. In an attempt to preserve Roman culture and history, the flamines and other religious orders such as the vestals were in charge of the sacred and religious items of Rome. Their objective was to take these treasures out of Rome so they wouldn't be destroyed by the Gauls. Ralph Mathisen writes, "Their sacred cult should not be abandoned as long as a single person survived to observe it".

The flamines were also prohibited from many different actions and rituals. In the case of death, flamines were in charge of performing ritual sacrificing. However, other than that, contact with anything related to death was prohibited so that the flamen could partake in his religious duties. One extreme example was in the case of the flamen's wife (Latin, flaminica). They were not allowed to wear Calcei Morticini, "shoes made from the skin of an animal that had died of natural causes." Since the animal was not part of a religious ritual or offered to the gods, these shoes would be seen as impure and disrespectful to the gods.

Another disadvantage for the flamines was that they "were also forbidden to touch, see, or refer to yeast, raw meat, goats, dogs, ivy, or beans," because it was thought that these could interfere with the flamen's religious practices. Most of these were associated with unsanitariness or death. When these flamines would have to perform ritual sacrifices, it was almost impossible for the flamen to avoid contact with raw meat. However, Roman accounts don't include such events in their writings. Another thing flamines were forbidden from was binding. They could not be bound to anything because it could hinder and jeopardize their position as flamen. Therefore, the only bind they were tied to was their religious position and priesthood.

Marriage 
The marriage of a flamen was extremely important because it was one of the requirements needed to be eligible for the flamen position. The flamen and his wife (the flaminica) needed to come from a Patrician background and the parents had to be married through the ancient ceremony of confarreatio. This only applied to the flamen, because when they married his wife would become part of his family. Through the process of confarreatio, the wife would pass from the manus (hand) of her father to the hand of her husband. This transferred the father's authority to her husband who would also become part of the religious cult. It was necessary for the wife to be a virgin and previously unwed before marriage to a prospective flamen. The position of flamen was also heavily dependent on the wife because they served together. In the case of either's death, the surviving priest would then step down from their position. It was viewed as unlucky to be widowed.

The flamen and flaminica could not separate or divorce. The only way to escape a marriage was through death, because, once they attained their positions, they became the property of the deity they were assigned to. Since they ruled together, they were also responsible for performing certain rituals together. During certain practices and rituals, the flamen and flaminica had to follow certain rules, such as leaving during purification rituals.  Another ritual practiced by the priest and priestess pertained to their bed. Only the flamen and flaminica were allowed to sleep in the bed for ritual reasons, and under no circumstance could they spend the night away from the bed for any longer than three days. This was meant to create and ensure a strong relationship between the couple. The end of the bed was lined with "a thin layer of clay."

Garb 
The official costume of a flamen, allegedly of great antiquity, was a hat called an apex and a heavy cloak called a laena. The laena was a double-thick wool cloak with a fringed edge, and was worn over the flamen's toga with a clasp to hold it around his throat. The apex was a leather skull-cap with a chin-strap and a point of olive wood on its top, like a spindle, with a little fluff of wool at the base of the spindle. This was the traditional outfit during a ritual or sacrifice performed by the flamen. The flamen would not wear the laena on a daily occurrence. The flamen would also wear special shoes known as calcei. The flamen dress represented status. Only flamines were able to wear such a costume. It separated them from average citizens, politicians, and military figures. The responsibility for the creation of such a costume fell in the hands of the flaminica. The costume was handmade and a ritual blade known as secespikta was used in the process. The laena had to be made of wool, because wool was seen as pure and the most appropriate clothing to serve the gods.

Duties and obligations 
The flamen and the flaminica had special roles that could not be done by the other. This position in Roman society was held to a specific standard with strict rules. The flamen could not perform the duties of the flaminica and she could not perform the duties of her husband. One example would be the honour killing and sacrifice of a ram, which was known as an offering to Jupiter and could only be done by the flaminica on market days. The flamen couldn't perform his sacred duties without the flaminica. These positions of serving the gods were meant to be served together as husband and wife. This was a partnership where each person was dependent on the other. This is why, when one died, the other would have to step down, because they were not allowed to replace their partner or continue by themselves.

Flamines maiores
The three  were required to be patricians:
The  oversaw the cult of Jupiter, the sky deity and ruler of the gods.
The  oversaw the cult of Mars, the god of war, leading public rites on the days sacred to Mars. The sacred spears of Mars were ritually shaken by the Flamen Martialis when the legions were preparing for war.
The  oversaw the cult of Quirinus, who presided over organized Roman social life and was related to the peaceful aspect of Mars. The Flamen Quirinalis led public rites on the days sacred to Quirinus.

A fourth  was dedicated to Julius Caesar as a divinity of the Roman state. Thereafter, any deceased emperor could be made divus by vote of the senate and consent of his successor, and as a divus he would be served by a flamen. The flamen's role in relation to living emperors is uncertain; no living emperor is known to have received official divine worship; see Imperial cult.

Flamines minores 

The twelve  could be plebeians. Some of the deities whose cult they tended were rather obscure, and only ten are known by name:

 , the flamen for Carmentis
 , for Ceres
 , for Falacer
 , for Flora
 , for Furrina
 , for Palatua
 , for Pomona
 , for Portunus
 , for Vulcan
 , for Volturnus

There were two other  during the Republican period, but the names of the deities they cultivated are unknown. The flamines minores seem mostly connected to agriculture or local cults. The change to an urban way of life may explain why these deities lost their importance or fell into oblivion.

Also preserved is the list of deities invoked by the  when he officiated at sacrifices to the goddesses Ceres and Tellus.

Some maintain the difference was not substantial. The  also had the privilege of having , assistants who carried out day-to-day business.

Notes

Citations

Sources

External links
William Smith's Dictionary of Greek and Roman Antiquities, 1875: "Flamen"

Ancient Roman religious titles
Divination